Mary Joseph (born on 2 June 1962) is an Indian Judge. Presently, she is Judge of Kerala High Court. The High Court of Kerala is the highest court in the Indian state of Kerala and in the Union Territory of Lakshadweep. The High Court of Kerala is headquartered at Ernakulam, Kochi.

Early life
She was born in Elamkulam, Ernakulam District. Completed her schooling from St. Joseph's U. P. School, Karithala, Karikkamuri, Ernakulam and  St. Teresa's Convent Girls High School, Ernakulam, graduation from Sacred Heart College, Thevara, completed law degree from Government Law College, Ernakulam and master's degree in law from Cochin University of Science and Technology at Ernakulam.

Career
She enrolled in Bar Council of Kerala on 26 January 1986 and started practicing as an advocate in civil and criminal laws at High Court Of Kerala and various subordinate courts at Ernakulam. She served as additional district government pleader and public prosecutor in District Court, Ernakulam from 1993 till 1996. She was appointed district judge in Kerala Judiciary in 2001. Later she was promoted as additional judge of the High Court of Kerala on 10 April 2015 and became appointed permanent judge from 5 April 2017.

References

Living people
Judges of the Kerala High Court
21st-century Indian judges
1962 births

External links
 High Court of Kerala